Ayer Shirley Regional High School is a high school located in Ayer, Massachusetts.  The school colors are maroon and white, and the mascot is the Panther. The student body contains about 350 students in 9th-12th grade.

School Support
The school built the Laura S. Leavitt Auditorium.  It was named after Ms. Leavitt, who was a Latin teacher.

Alumni
Rita Briggs, professional baseball player
Jamie Morris, American football player
Joe Morris, American football player
Norbert Wiener (1906), mathematician

References

An American Education In a section called: "Most wondrous, in my life, was the auditorium".

External links
Ayer Shirley Regional High School website
Ayer Shirley Regional School District website

Schools in Middlesex County, Massachusetts
Public high schools in Massachusetts